

 

The Road to Terror: Stalin and the Self-Destruction of the Bolsheviks, 19321939 is a political history of the Soviet Union from 19321939 written by John Archibald Getty III and Oleg V. Naumov. Originally published by Yale University Press in 1999, it was reissued as an updated and abridged version in 2010 and is part of the Annals of Communism series.

Reviews
 Altrichter, H. (2000). Book Review: The Road to Terror: Stalin and the Self-Destruction of the Bolsheviks, 1932–1939. Jahrbücher Für Geschichte Osteuropas, 48(4), 615–616. JSTOR
 Bernstein, L. (2002). Book Review: The Road to Terror: Stalin and the Self-Destruction of the Bolsheviks, 1932–1939. International Labor and Working-Class History, 61, 205–207. JSTOR
 Brooks, J. (2001). Book Review: The Road to Terror: Stalin and the Self-Destruction of the Bolsheviks, 1932–1939. The Historian, 64(1), 183–184. JSTOR
 Halfin, I. (2001). Book Review: The Road to Terror: Stalin and the Self-Destruction of the Bolsheviks, 1932–1939. Slavic Review, 60(4), 859–861. JSTOR. 
 Hanson, G. A. (1999). Book Review: The Road to Terror: Stalin and the Self-Destruction of the Bolsheviks, 1932–1939. Russian History, 26(1), 106–107. JSTOR
 Harris, J. (2003). Was Stalin a Weak Dictator? The Journal of Modern History, 75(2), 375–386. JSTOR
 Kinloch, N. (2000). Documenting Mass-Murder. Teaching History, 99, 62–63. JSTOR
 Moullec, G.-G. (2002). Book Review: The Road to Terror: Stalin and the Self-Destruction of the Bolsheviks, 1932–1939. Journal of Cold War Studies, 4(3), 160–161. JSTOR
 Nordlander, D. J. (2000). Book Review: The Road to Terror: Stalin and the Self-Destruction of the Bolsheviks, 1932–1939. Europe-Asia Studies, 52(4), 769–771. JSTOR
 Prozorov, S. (2013). Living Ideas and Dead Bodies: The Biopolitics of Stalinism. Alternatives: Global, Local, Political, 38(3), 208–227. JSTOR
 Rees, E. A. (2000). The Great Terror: Suicide or Murder? The Russian Review, 59(3), 446–450. JSTOR
 Schoenfeld, G. (2000). Book Review: The Road to Terror: Stalin and the Self-Destruction of the Bolsheviks, 1932–1939. Journal of Cold War Studies, 2(3), 143–145. JSTOR
 Ward, C. (2001). Book Review: The Road to Terror: Stalin and the Self-Destruction of the Bolsheviks, 1932–1939. The American Historical Review, 106(1), 291–291. JSTOR

Publication history
 1999 Original publication by Yale University Press (pp. 635)
 2010 Updated and abridged version by Yale University press (pp. 320)

See also
 Bibliography of Stalinism and the Soviet Union
 Stalin: Waiting for Hitler, 1929-1941
 Stalin: Breaker of Nations

Notes

References

External links
 Stalin's Great Terror. An interview with Prof. J. Arch Getty, University of California, Los Angeles

1999 non-fiction books
2010 non-fiction books
20th-century history books
Books about Joseph Stalin
Books about Stalinism
History books about the Soviet Union
Yale University Press books